"Jealous of My Boogie" is the second single from RuPaul's album Champion. It was released to iTunes on June 16, 2009, as part of the EP Jealous of My Boogie - The RuMixes, and released again as track two of the Champion album. The single include ringtones of catchphrases from RuPaul's Drag Race as well as a new version of "Cover Girl" with a rap by BeBe Zahara Benet, winner of the show's first season.

Promotion
RuPaul performed the song at the NewNowNext Awards.

The music video starring Chi Chi LaRue was released May 11, 2009. A second music video which was directed by Mathu Andersen and featured the three finalists of RuPaul's Drag Race 2 was published April 27, 2010.

Track listing

References

2009 singles
LGBT-related songs
RuPaul songs
Songs about jealousy